The 2006 Cork Senior Football Championship was the 118th staging of the Cork Senior Football Championship since its establishment by the Cork County Board in 1887. The draw for the opening fixtures took place on 11 December 2005. The championship began on 8 April 2006 and ended on 29 October 2006.

Nemo Rangers entered the championship as the defending champions. Mallow and St Michael's became the first two teams to be officially relegated from the championship.

On 29 October 2006, Nemo Rangers won the championship following a 1-11 to 0-07 defeat of Dohenys in the final. This was their 15th championship title overall and their second title in succession.

Nemo's James Masters was the championship's top scorer with 2-40.

Team changes

To Championship

Promoted from the Cork Intermediate Football Championship
 Carbery Rangers

Results

Round 1

Round 2

Castlehaven received a bye in this round.

Relegation playoffs

Divisional/colleges section

Round 3

Round 4

Quarter-finals

Semi-finals

Final

Championship statistics

Top scorer

Overall

In a single game

References

Cork Senior Football Championship
Cork Senior Football Championship